East Huntingdon Township is a township in Westmoreland County, Pennsylvania, United States. The population was 7,712 at the 2020 census.  From 1978 to 1988, the township had been home to the Volkswagen Westmoreland Assembly Plant, which later became a Sony plant. As of 2020 companies there include DNP, Cenveo, and Siemens.

History
The East Huntingdon official website contains a history of the township. 

The West Overton Historic District was listed on the National Register of Historic Places in 1985.

The township was the site of the Morewood Massacre of 1891, which occurred during a labor union protest.

Geography
It includes the communities of West Overton, Ruffs Dale, Central, Tars, Rocktown, Feree, West Bethany, Lauffer, Donnelly, Morewood, Reagantown, Alverton, Mayfield, Bessemer, Buckeye, Green Lick, Iron Bridge, Pinetree and Chaintown. To the north is New Stanton Borough; to the south is Scottdale and Fayette County.

Demographics

At the 2000 census there were 7,781 people, 3,142 households, and 2,271 families living in the township.  The population density was 237.3 people per square mile (91.6/km2).  There were 3,289 housing units at an average density of 100.3/sq mi (38.7/km2).  The racial makeup of the township was 98.68% White, 0.48% African American, 0.09% Native American, 0.22% Asian, 0.03% Pacific Islander, 0.13% from other races, and 0.39% from two or more races. Hispanic or Latino of any race were 0.30%.

Of the 3,142 households 30.0% had children under the age of 18 living with them, 57.7% were married couples living together, 10.5% had a female householder with no husband present, and 27.7% were non-families. 24.3% of households were one person and 11.4% were one person aged 65 or older.  The average household size was 2.46 and the average family size was 2.92.

The age distribution was 22.5% under the age of 18, 6.9% from 18 to 24, 29.3% from 25 to 44, 24.3% from 45 to 64, and 17.0% 65 or older.  The median age was 40 years. For every 100 females, there were 92.4 males.  For every 100 females age 18 and over, there were 90.8 males.

The median household income was $32,460 and the median family income  was $39,927. Males had a median income of $29,835 versus $22,787 for females. The per capita income for the township was $15,598.  About 9.0% of families and 10.6% of the population were below the poverty line, including 15.1% of those under age 18 and 8.7% of those age 65 or over.

See also
Official township website

References

Townships in Westmoreland County, Pennsylvania
Pittsburgh metropolitan area